Carlos Cuesta García (born 29 July 1995) is a Spanish football manager who is assistant manager of Arsenal.

Career

Born in Mallorca, Cuesta was part of Santa Catalina Atlético academy, before deciding to start studing for football manager at the age of just 18. He started his managerial career as manager of the youth academy of Spanish side Atlético Madrid. In 2018, he was appointed assistant manager of the youth academy of Juventus in Italy.

In 2020, Cuesta was appointed assistant manager of English Premier League club Arsenal.

References

1995 births
Arsenal F.C. non-playing staff
Atlético Madrid non-playing staff
Juventus F.C. non-playing staff
Association football defenders
Expatriate football managers in England
Expatriate football managers in Italy
Living people
Spanish expatriate football managers
Spanish expatriate sportspeople in England
Spanish expatriate sportspeople in Italy
Spanish football managers
Spanish footballers